Arbuckle Place is a historic home located at Assawoman, Accomack County, Virginia. It was built in 1774, and has a -story, hall and parlor plan dwelling with brick ends and frame front and back.  It has a steep gable roof.  The interior features complex paneling with built in cupboards and original doors and hardware.  The house is a rare survivor of
a once common Eastern Shore form, the small brick end house.

It was added to the National Register of Historic Places in 1986.

References

Houses on the National Register of Historic Places in Virginia
Houses completed in 1774
National Register of Historic Places in Accomack County, Virginia
Houses in Accomack County, Virginia
1774 establishments in Virginia
Hall and parlor houses